Dalberson Ferreira do Amaral, known simply as Dalberson (born 13 January 1997) is a Brazilian football player. He plays for CSA.

Club career
On 7 July 2021, he signed a three-year contract with Primeira Liga club Famalicão in Portugal.

He made his Primeira Liga debut for Famalicão on 18 September 2021 in a game against Marítimo and kept a clean sheet in a 0–0 tie.

References

External links
 

1997 births
Sportspeople from Minas Gerais
Living people
Brazilian footballers
Association football goalkeepers
Boa Esporte Clube players
Joinville Esporte Clube players
Brusque Futebol Clube players
F.C. Famalicão players
Centro Sportivo Alagoano players
Campeonato Catarinense players
Campeonato Brasileiro Série D players
Primeira Liga players
Brazilian expatriate footballers
Expatriate footballers in Portugal
Brazilian expatriate sportspeople in Portugal